Ypsolopha cristata is a moth of the family Ypsolophidae. It is known from Japan, Korea, north-eastern China and Russia.

The wingspan is 22–23 mm.

References

Ypsolophidae
Moths of Asia